This is a list of cathedrals in Austria, including both actual and former diocesan cathedrals (seats of bishops). Almost all cathedrals in Austria are Roman Catholic, but any non-Roman Catholic cathedrals are also listed here.

The list is intended to be complete.

Although the word "Kathedrale" is used formally in German, the more usual word is "Dom". This not only refers to cathedrals in the proper sense as the seats of bishops, but also to a small number of large churches in Austria, which are known as "Dom" as a mark of distinction or historical importance (sometimes known by the description "Prachtdom", i.e., churches called "Dom" because of their magnificence or splendour). These are included in a separate section, without implying that they have the status of cathedrals.

Roman Catholic cathedrals

{| class="wikitable sortable"
!Cathedral!!Archdioceseor Diocese!!Location!!Dedication!!Description!!Notes
|-
|Eisenstadt CathedralEisenstädter Dom; Dom Sankt Martin, Eisenstadt
|Diocese of Eisenstadt
|Burgenland, Eisenstadt
|Saint Martin
|cathedral
|from 1960, when the diocese was created
|-
|Feldkirch CathedralFeldkircher Dom; Dom Sankt Nikolai, Feldkirch
|Diocese of Feldkirch
|Vorarlberg, Feldkirch
|Saint Nicholas
|cathedral
|from 1968, when the diocese was created
|-
|Göss AbbeyReichsstift Göss; Stiftskirche St. Andrä
|Diocese of Graz-Seckau
|Styria, Leoben
|Blessed Virgin Mary and Saint Andrew
|former cathedral, previously an abbey church; now a parish church
|Benedictine abbey 12th century-1782; cathedral of the Diocese of Leoben, founded 1785, abolished 1859 (although administered by the Diocese of Seckau after the death of the first and only bishop in 1800)
|-
|Graz CathedralGrazer Dom; Dom Sankt Ägydius, Graz
|Diocese of Graz-Seckau
|Styria, Graz
|Saint Giles
|cathedral
|from 1782 or 1786, on the move of the seat of the Bishops of Seckau to Graz
|-
|Gurk CathedralGurker Dom; Dom Mariä Himmelfahrt, Gurk|Diocese of Gurk-Klagenfurt
|Carinthia, Gurk
|Assumption of the Blessed Virgin Mary
|co-cathedral
|from 1787; cathedral of the Diocese of Gurk 1071-1787
|-
|Innsbruck CathedralInnsbrucker Dom; Dom Sankt Jakob, Innsbruck|Diocese of Innsbruck
|Tyrol, Innsbruck
|Saint James the Great
|cathedral
|from 1964, when the diocese of Innsbruck-Feldkirch was created; renamed diocese of Innsbruck in 1968
|-
|Klagenfurt CathedralKlagenfurter Dom; Dom der Heiligen Petrus und Paulus, Klagenfurt|Diocese of Gurk-Klagenfurt
|Carinthia, Klagenfurt
|Saint Peter and Saint Paul
|cathedral
|from 1787, when the bishops' seat was transferred here from Gurk
|-
|New Cathedral, LinzNeuer Dom; Mariä-Empfängnis-Dom, Linz|Diocese of Linz
|Upper Austria, Linz
|Immaculate Conception
|cathedral 
|from 1924, when dedicated, replacing the Old Cathedral, Linz; construction began in 1855/1862
|-
|Old Cathedral, LinzAlter Dom; Domkirche St. Ignatius, Linz|Diocese of Linz
|Upper Austria, Linz
|Saint Ignatius Loyola
|co-cathedral
|from 1924, after the dedication of the present cathedral; cathedral 1785-1924; previously a Jesuit church (from 1669)
|-
|Basilica of St Laurence, LorchBasilika St. Laurenz|Diocese of Linz
|Upper Austria, Enns, Lorch
|Saint Lawrence
|minor basilica
|an earlier building on the site was the cathedral in the 4th/5th centuries of the bishopric of Lauriacum, the bishopric of the Roman province of Noricum; the present church dates from the 13th/14th centuries, and has never been the seat of a bishop (the title of Archbishop of Lauriacum has recently been re-created for a titular archbishopric).
|-
|Salzburg CathedralSalzburger Dom|Archdiocese of Salzburg
|State of Salzburg, Salzburg
|Saint Vergil and Saint Rupert
|cathedral
|from 987, in an earlier building on the site; the present building was dedicated in 1628
|-
|St. Peter's Archabbey, SalzburgErzabtei St. Peter|Archdiocese of Salzburg
|State of Salzburg, Salzburg
|Saint Peter
|former cathedral, abbey church
|until 987, the abbey church was also the cathedral, as the abbots of St. Peter's were also the Archbishops of Salzburg
|-
|Franciscan Church, SalzburgFranziskanerkirche Unserer Lieben Frau, Salzburg|Archdiocese of Salzburg
|State of Salzburg, Salzburg
|Blessed Virgin Mary
|pro-cathedral 1600-28, parish church; former friary church
|used as cathedral while the present Salzburg Cathedral was under construction
|-
|Sankt Andrä Cathedral; St. Andrew's Church, Sankt AndräDom- und Stadtpfarrkirche St. Andrä im Lavanttal 
|Diocese of Gurk-Klagenfurt
|Carinthia, Sankt Andrä
|Saint Andrew
|former cathedral, now parish church
|cathedral of the former Diocese of Lavant from 1228 to 1859, when the diocese was moved to Marburg (Maribor, now in Slovenia)
|-
|Sankt Pölten CathedralSankt Pöltner Dom; Dom Mariä Himmelfahrt, Sankt Pölten |Diocese of Sankt Pölten
|Lower Austria, Sankt Pölten
|Assumption of the Blessed Virgin Mary
|cathedral
|from 1785 (diocese created in 1784/85)
|-
|Seckau AbbeyDom- und Abteikirche Mariä Himmelfahrt; Dom im Gebirg|Diocese of Graz-Seckau
|Seckau
|Assumption of the Blessed Virgin Mary
|co-cathedral, abbey church; minor basilica
|from 1782; cathedral of the Diocese of Seckau 1218-1782, although in practice the bishops were based at the nearby Schloss Seggau
|-
|St. Stephen's Cathedral, ViennaStephansdom|Archdiocese of Vienna
|Vienna
|Saint Stephen
|cathedral; World Heritage Site
|from 1147, the date of foundation of the diocese
|-
|Wettingen-Mehrerau AbbeyTerritorialabtei Wettingen-Mehrerau|territory of Wettingen-Mehrerau Abbey
|Vorarlberg, Bregenz
|The Blessed Virgin Mary, Star of the Sea, and of Mehrerau
|territorial abbey (directly subordinate to the Holy See)
|formerly Benedictine (c .611-1807), now Cistercian (from 1854); the abbot has the rank of a bishop in respect of the abbey's territory
|-
|Cathedral of the Military Ordinariate in AustriaSt.-Georgs-Kathedrale, Wiener Neustadt|Military Ordinariate of AustriaMilitärseelsorge Österreich|Lower Austria, Wiener Neustadt
|Saint George
|cathedral since 1987
|also the chapel of Burg Wiener Neustadt and the Theresian Military Academy 
|-
|Wiener Neustadt CathedralDom Mariä Himmelfahrt und St. Rupert; Liebfrauendom|Archdiocese of Vienna
|Lower Austria, Wiener Neustadt
|Assumption of Mary and Saint Rupert
|former cathedral, now parish church
|cathedral from 1468 or 1469 to 1785 of the former Diocese of Wiener Neustadt (now a titular bishopric)
|}

Old Catholic cathedrals

Orthodox Cathedrals

Non-episcopal churches often referred to as Dom

The following churches are often referred to as Dom but have never been the seats of bishops:Maria Saaler Dom, or Church of the Assumption, Maria Saal, Carinthia: pilgrimage church (a predecessor church was the administrative centre of the missionary bishops - "chorepiscopi" - of Carinthia from the 8th century to 945 and similar in status to a cathedral; the present building dates from the 15th century and has never been the seat of a bishop)Pongauer Dom, or St. John's Church, St. Johann im Pongau, Salzburg (Land): parish churchSöllandler Bauerndom, or Church of Saints Peter and Paul, Söll, Tyrol: parish churchDom am Pyhrn, Stift Spital am Pyhrn, Pfarrkirche Mariä Himmelfahrt'', or Church of the Assumption, on the Pyhrn Pass, Spital am Pyhrn, Upper Austria: parish church, originally the church of a hospital, later a collegiate foundation, now a museum and concert venue

Notes and references

See also

Lists of cathedrals by country

 
Austria
Cathedrals
Cathedrals#

de:Dome, Münster und Kathedralen in deutschsprachigen Ländern#Österreich